Mustafa Akgül (10 May 1948 - 13 December 2017) was a Turkish computer scientist who was the key figure of the acceptance of the Internet in Turkey.

He went to the University of Waterloo, Canada and got his PhD in Combinatorics and Optimisation.

He started with the motto of "Internet is life". He had many different ways to reach people in academia, in social media, and ordinary people at the street. The main problem, initially, was to raise public awareness of the Internet in Turkey.

References

External links
 Bilkent University - Mustafa Akgül Web Page
 Official Web Page - Mustafa Akgül
 Blog - Mustafa Akgül
 Senior researcher, The Internet Policy Review, Journal on Internet Regulation - Mustafa Akgül

1948 births
2017 deaths
Turkish computer scientists
Academic staff of Bilkent University
University of Waterloo alumni
Free software programmers